The 2021–22 season is Ittihad Riadi Tanger's 39th season in existence and the club's 23rd in the top flight of Moroccan football, and seventh consecutive.

Kit
Supplier: Gloria Sport / Club Sponsor: front: Tanger-Med , back: Biougnach / League Sponsor: sleeves: Inwi.

Season review

August

On 6 August, Ittihad Tanger announced the departure of Driss El Mrabet as the first team head coach by mutual consent.

On 8 August, Ittihad Tanger announced that Bernard Casoni would be the new head coach until 30 June 2023.

On 13 August, Ittihad Tanger announced the signing of Hamdi Laachir from RS Berkane on a free transfer.

On 14 August, Ittihad Tanger announced the signing of Abdelatif Noussir from MA Tétouan on a Free transfer.

On 18 August, Ittihad Tanger announced the signing of Youssef Benali from Bourges Foot on a Free transfer.

On 20 August, Ittihad Tanger announced the return of Ahmad Hamoudan from a serie of loans since 2018, the last one to Umm Salal SC.

On 24 August, Ittihad Tanger announced the signing of Abdellah El Moudene from MC Oujda on a Free transfer. The Club Also announced the signing of Mouad Ajandouz from Mohammed VI Football Academy.

September

On 4 September, Ittihad Tanger announced the signing of Hamza Hassani Boouia from CR Al Hoceima on a Free transfer. The Club Also announced the signing of Habib Allah Dahmani from Muaither SC.

On 11 September, Ittihad Tanger announced the signing of Pape Paye from Sochaux on a Free transfer.

October

On 11 October, President Abdelhamid Aberchane announced his resignation and the resignation of his board of directors, after nine years of being the head of the club.

November
On 2 November, Ittihad Tanger announced the dismissal of Bernard Casoni as the first team coach, ending his spell at the club after 3 months, and announced the appointment of the training director Jaafar R'kyek as the interim manager of the first team.

On 30 November, Ittihad Tanger announced the appointment of Miguel Ángel Gamondi as the new first team head coach until 2024.

December

On 7 March, Mohamed Ahagan was elected as the new club president.

January

On 6 January, Ittihad Tanger Terminate the contract of player Pape Paye by mutual consent.

February

On 18 January, Ittihad Tangiers and the Biougnach brand sign a sponsorship and advertising contract for the remainder of the season.

April
On 17 April, Ittihad Tanger announced the termination of the first team coach Miguel Ángel Gamondi's contract and his assistant Tarik Chihab unilaterally.

On 18 April, Ittihad Tanger announced its contract with coach Juan Pedro Benali to supervise the team until the end of the current sports season.

Squad

 = ineligible players
(A) = originally from the academy

From youth squad

Transfers

In

Out

Technical staff 

until 2 November 2021

until 30 November 2021

until 17 April 2022

Pre-season and friendlies

Competitions

Overview

Botola

Standings

Results summary

Results by round

Matches

Results overview

Throne Cup

Statistics

Squad appearances and goals
Last updated on 5 July 2022.

|-
! colspan=14 style=background:#dcdcdc; text-align:center|Goalkeepers

|-
! colspan=14 style=background:#dcdcdc; text-align:center|Defenders

|-
! colspan=14 style=background:#dcdcdc; text-align:center|Midfielders

|-
! colspan=14 style=background:#dcdcdc; text-align:center|Forwards

|-
! colspan=14 style=background:#dcdcdc; text-align:center| Players who have made an appearance or had a squad number this season but have left the club
|-

|}
 = ineligible players

Goalscorers

Assists

Hat-tricks

(H) – Home ; (A) – Away

Clean sheets
Last updated on 5 July 2022.

Disciplinary record

Injury record

See also

2015–16 IR Tanger season
2016–17 IR Tanger season 
2017–18 IR Tanger season
2018–19 IR Tanger season
2019–20 IR Tanger season
2020–21 IR Tanger season

References

External links

Moroccan football club seasons
Ittihad Tanger
2021–22 in Moroccan football